The Michigan Panthers are a professional American football team based in Detroit. The Panthers compete in the United States Football League (USFL) as a member of the North Division. The team plays their home games at Ford Field in Downtown Detroit, which also hosts the Detroit Lions of the National Football League (NFL).

History 
The Michigan Panthers were one of eight teams that were officially announced as a USFL franchise on The Herd with Colin Cowherd on November 22, 2021. On January 27, 2022, it was announced on The Herd with Colin Cowherd that former NFL Head coach Jeff Fisher was named the head coach and general manager of the Panthers.

The Panthers selected Michigan quarterback Shea Patterson with the first overall pick in the 2022 USFL Draft. In the first two games of 2022, the Panthers lost to the Houston Gamblers and New Jersey Generals. On May 1, 2022, the team won their first ever game with a 24–0 win at Protective Stadium against the Pittsburgh Maulers. Losses resumed after that, the Panthers' only other win of the season was against the Maulers, a 33–21 with the winner assuming the rights to the first overall pick in the 2023 USFL Draft.

In October, 2022, the Panthers hired Steve Kazor as general manager. After all eight USFL teams played their home games in Birmingham, Alabama, the Panthers moved to the state of Michigan in 2023, announcing Ford Field as their home stadium. On February 3, 2023, the USFL announced that Fisher had been replaced as head coach by Mike Nolan, citing only "personal reasons."

Personnel

Current roster 
Initially, each team carried a 38-man active roster and a 7-man practice squad, but the rosters were increased to 40 active players and 50 total in May, 2022.

Staff

Statistics and records

Season-by-season record

Note: The Finish, Wins, Losses, and Ties columns list regular season results and exclude any postseason play.

Records

References

External links

2021 establishments in Alabama
American football teams established in 2021
Michigan Panthers (2022)
American football teams in Detroit
United States Football League (2022) teams